The Royal Welsh Regiment was an infantry regiment of the Territorial Army in the United Kingdom. It existed from 1999, until it was re-designated as the 3rd Battalion, The Royal Welsh in 2006.

History
The regiment was formed in 1999 as part of the restructuring of the TA by the amalgamation of the two Welsh TA battalions, namely: 3rd (Volunteer) Battalion, Royal Welch Fusiliers; and 2nd (Volunteer) Battalion, Royal Regiment of Wales Its initial structure was as follows:
HQ Company, at Maindy Barracks, Cardiff
A (Royal Welch Fusiliers) Company, at Wrexham and Queensferry(from HQ and A Companies, 3rd Battalion, Royal Welch Fusiliers)
B (Royal Regiment of Wales) Company, at Swansea(from A Company, 2nd Battalion, Royal Regiment of Wales)
C (Royal Regiment of Wales) Company, at Maindy Barracks, Cardiff and Pontypridd(from HQ and C Companies, 2nd Battalion, Royal Regiment of Wales)
D (Royal Welch Fusiliers) Company, at Colwyn Bay and Caernarfon(from B and D Companies, 3rd Battalion, Royal Welch Fusiliers)

No new cap badge was created for this regiment, soldiers wore their former regimental cap badge or were badged according to the company they joined.

3rd Battalion, Royal Welsh
As part of the restructuring of the infantry announced in 2004, the Royal Welsh Regiment became the TA battalion of the new amalgamated regiment of Wales, the Royal Welsh, on the 1 March 2006.

Companies and platoons reported in December 2020 include:
Headquarters Company, at Maindy Barracks, Cardiff
Corps of Drums at Raglan Barracks, Newport
B Company, at Swansea
Platoon, at Aberystwyth
C Company, at Pontypridd
Mortar Platoon, at Merthyr Tydfil
D Company, at Colwyn Bay
Anti-Tank Platoon, at Hightown Barracks, Wrexham

References

Infantry regiments of the British Army
Military units and formations established in 1999
1999 establishments in the United Kingdom
Military units and formations disestablished in 2006